Anacamptodes fragilaria, the kiawe moth, koa haole looper or citrus looper, is a species of moth in the family Geometridae. The species was first described by John Arthur Grossbeck in 1909. It is found in the Hawaiian islands of Kauai, Niihau, Oahu, Molokai, Maui and Hawaii as well as California, where it is native.

There are five generations per year.

Food
The larvae are a pest on citrus species. Recorded hosts are: 
 
 Acacia farnesiana
 Amaranthus
 Antigonon leptopus
 Bauhinia monandra
 Calliandra haematomma
 Cassia grandis
 Cassia javanica × Cassia fistula
 Cordia subcordata
 Delonix regia
 Desmanthus virgatus
 Hibiscus
 Justicia betonica
 Leucaena glauca
 Litchi chinensis
 Macadamia ternifolia
 Malvastrum tricuspidatum
 Merremia tuberosa
 Momordica balsamina
 Nicotiana glauca
 Ocimum basilicum
 Passiflora foetida
 Pithecellobium dulce
 Portulaca oleracea
 Prosopis chilensis
 Psidium cattleianum
 Rosa
 Samanea saman
 Santalum album
 Schinus molle
 Schinus terebinthifolius
 Sida
 Spathodea campanulata
 Tectona grandis
 Terminalia catappa

References

External links
Images of Anacamptodes fragilaria

Boarmiini
Moths described in 1909
Moths of North America
Moths of Oceania
Insects of Hawaii
Fauna of the California chaparral and woodlands